Irish (Gaeilge) is a subject of the Junior Cycle examination in Secondary schools in Ireland. There are three levels: Higher (commonly known as Honours), Ordinary (commonly known as Pass) and Foundation.

Syllabus
The Irish syllabus at the Junior Cycle level is aimed at developing the student's aural, speech and written skills in Irish. The examination tests the students on aural, written, and literature skills.
There is an optional oral at Junior Cert Level. Choosing this option aids with pronunciation and speaking Irish for the Leaving Certificate examination.

Higher level
The Higher level examination has three parts, two written papers, which last 3 hours (180 minutes) in total and are worth 240 marks, and an aural comprehension (Irish: Cluastuiscint) examination, which lasts 30 minutes, with a maximum of 40 marks available.
There are certain rules which apply to all students. For example, a studied Novel can only be used in the novel section and students must write only one essay. Students are also required to answer all sections of the exam. Marks will be lost otherwise.

Questions
Written/Aural Paper 1 (2 hours) has two sections: Written Language, and Comprehension:

Written Paper 2 ( 1 hour 30 mins ) has four sections: Prose, Poetry and Letter writing:

For students taking the optional Oral (which is worth 160 marks) they are graded out of 400 marks over the 240 for students not taking the Oral examination. The Oral is worth 40% of the examination.

Ordinary level
The Ordinary level examination has three parts, a written examination, which lasts 1 hour 30 minutes (90 minutes) and is worth 220 marks, and an aural comprehension (Irish: Cluastuiscint) examination, which lasts 30 minutes, with a maximum of 100 marks availableamd an oral examination lasting about 10 minutes

Questions
This paper has two sections, Section 1 (Roinn 1), which is the comprehension (Léamhthuiscint) section, and Section 2, the written language (Scríobh na Teanga) section.  Each carries 110 marks.

Section One: Comprehension

Section Two: Written Language

External links
 Department of Education and Science - Irish Junior Cycle Syllabus (in Irish)
 skoool.ie - Irish Junior Cycle Study Notes